Gymnostachyum is an Asian genus of plants in the family Acanthaceae.

Species
The Catalogue of Life lists the following species:

Gymnostachyum affine
Gymnostachyum alatum
Gymnostachyum andrographioides
Gymnostachyum argyroneurum
Gymnostachyum canescens
Gymnostachyum ceylanicum
Gymnostachyum coriaceum
Gymnostachyum cumingianum
Gymnostachyum decurrens
Gymnostachyum diversifolium
Gymnostachyum febrifugum
Gymnostachyum giganteum
Gymnostachyum glabrum
Gymnostachyum glomeratum
Gymnostachyum glomeruliflorum
Gymnostachyum gracile
Gymnostachyum hirsutum
Gymnostachyum hirtistylum
Gymnostachyum hirtum
Gymnostachyum insulare
Gymnostachyum javanicum
Gymnostachyum keithii
Gymnostachyum knoxiifolium
Gymnostachyum kwangsiense
Gymnostachyum larsenii
Gymnostachyum lateriflorum
Gymnostachyum latifolium
Gymnostachyum leptostachyum
Gymnostachyum listeri
Gymnostachyum longifolium
Gymnostachyum longispicatum
Gymnostachyum magisnervatum
Gymnostachyum magnum
Gymnostachyum nudispicum
Gymnostachyum ovatum
Gymnostachyum palawanense
Gymnostachyum pallens
Gymnostachyum paniculatum
Gymnostachyum parishii
Gymnostachyum pearcei
Gymnostachyum pictum
Gymnostachyum princemoniumGymnostachyum polyanthumGymnostachyum polyneuronGymnostachyum ridleyiGymnostachyum robinsoniiGymnostachyum listeriGymnostachyum sahyadricumGymnostachyum sanguinolentumGymnostachyum scortechiniiGymnostachyum serrulatumGymnostachyum signatumGymnostachyum simplicicauleGymnostachyum sinenseGymnostachyum spiciformeGymnostachyum subacauleGymnostachyum subcordatumGymnostachyum subrosulatumGymnostachyum thwaitesiiGymnostachyum tomentosumGymnostachyum trichosepalumGymnostachyum triflorumGymnostachyum trilobumGymnostachyum variegatumGymnostachyum venustumGymnostachyum warrieranum''

Gallery

References

External links 

Acanthaceae genera
Acanthaceae
Taxonomy articles created by Polbot
Lamiales of Asia